Club Social, Cultural y Deportivo Grecia is a sports club based in Chone, Ecuador. They are best known for their professional football team.

Current squad

Grecia
Association football clubs established in 1986
1986 establishments in Ecuador